Piotrków Pierwszy  is a village in the administrative district of Gmina Jabłonna, within Lublin County, Lublin Voivodeship, in eastern Poland.
The village has a population of 790.

location

Piotrków lies on the Czerniejówka Lublin Upland.
It is located in the central part of Lublin Voivodeship in the Lublin district in the municipality of Jabłonna, at Voivodeship road 835.

In the village there are:
 Church;
 Cultural Centre (GCK);
 primary school;
 Public high school;
 public kindergarten;
 Sports Club PLKS "Piotrcovia Piotrków";
 volunteer fire brigade;
 stadium "Orlik"

History
Piotrków is a very old village. Village existed in the early Middle Ages. The former royal property and manage its tenant. In 1388, King Jogaila village moved to Magdeburg rights.

During World War I was the front here, the whole village was burned. When the front of the local people had gone to clean up the field with the corpses of soldiers flooded the Austro-Hungarian and Imperial Russian Army. Until today, there are remnants of trenches in the woods. In the village there are three war cemeteries from World War I.

References

Villages in Lublin County